Gondal is a proto-Somali archaeological site in southern Somalia. The site of ancient ruins, it is considered a predecessor of Kismayo.

See also
Abasa
Nimmo
Somali architecture

References

Archaeological sites in Somalia
Former populated places in Somalia
Archaeological sites of Eastern Africa